León Fernando Villa Arango (born 12 January 1960) is a former professional Colombian football defender who played in the 1990 FIFA World Cup for the Colombia national football team.

Career
Born in Medellín, Villa played professional football for Independiente Medellín, Atlético Nacional and Deportes Quindío. He won the 1989 Copa Libertadores with Nacional.

After he retired from playing, Villa became a football coach. He managed Quindío in 1994.

References

1960 births
Living people
Footballers from Medellín
Colombian footballers
Colombia international footballers
1989 Copa América players
1990 FIFA World Cup players
Independiente Medellín footballers
Atlético Nacional footballers
Deportes Quindío footballers
Categoría Primera A players
Colombian football managers

Association football defenders